Rainer may refer to:

People
 Rainer (surname)
 Rainer (given name)

Other
 Rainer Island, an island in Franz Josef Land, Russia
 16802 Rainer, an asteroid
 Rainer Foundation, British charitable organisation

See also
 Rainier (disambiguation)
 Rayner (disambiguation)
 Raynor
 Reiner (disambiguation)
 Reyner